Gowers is a surname of Welsh origin.  Notable people with the name include:

 Andrew Gowers (born 1957), financial journalist and media strategist
Gowers Review of Intellectual Property, 2006
 Andrew Gowers (footballer) (born 1969), Australian rules footballer 
 Ashley Gowers (born 1994), English cricketer
 Billy Gowers (born 1996), Australian rules footballer 
 Bruce Gowers (1940–2023), British television director and producer
 Emily Gowers (born 1963), British classical scholar
 Ernest Gowers (1880–1966), author of writing style guides
 Gillian Gowers (born 1964), English badminton player 
 Ken Gowers (1936–2017), English rugby league player
 Patrick Gowers (1936–2014), English music composer 
 Peter Gowers (born 1972), British businessman
 Timothy Gowers, FRS (born 1963), British mathematician
Gowers norm, in additive combinatorics
 Trevor Gowers (1945–1996), Australian rules footballer 
 Walter Gowers (1903–1965), English footballer and rugby league player
 William Frederick Gowers (1875–1954), British colonial administrator
 William Richard Gowers (1845–1915), British neurologist
Gowers' sign, indicating weakness of the proximal muscles

See also
 
 Gower (disambiguation)
 Gower (surname)
 Old Gowers, former pupils of University College School

References